The Bell site (also known as 47 Wn-09) is located on the south side of Big Lake Butte des Morts in Winnebago County, Wisconsin, about 52 miles southeast of Green Bay.  The site is classified as an early (c. 1600-1750 AD) Historic village of the Fox tribe.

Discovery 
The Bell site was first discovered in 1911 when gravel mining operations uncovered the burial of an Indian chief and his horse. In the 1950s the site came to the attention of professional archaeologists.  Mixed historic and prehistoric materials were being found by collectors, and the pottery was unlike any previously found at archaeological sites in Wisconsin.  It was hypothesized that this site could be a village of a Central Angonkian tribe (native to Michigan or Ontario) which had been displaced in the 1600s during the Iroquois wars.  Further research in the Wisconsin Historical Collections revealed that early French explorers had recorded a village of the Fox tribe at the location of the site.

1959 excavations 
In 1959 evacuations took place with the joint efforts of the State Historical Society, the Wisconsin Archaeological Survey and the Oshkosh Public Museum, under the direction of Warren L. Wittry of the Cranbrook Institute of Science.

Features 
Features identified at the site include: 
 the remains of a palisade or defensive wall
 45 storage/refuse pits
 a bear skull placed in a manner suggestive of the early historic practice of bear ceremonialism
 a burial of 3 dogs suggestive of the early historic practice of dog sacrifice. Dog burials have also been noted at a site in St. Ignace, Michigan, and there are accounts from early French explorers describing the practice among Great Lakes tribes.
 a human burial; several other burials were uncovered when the site was originally discovered in 1911
 several post molds suggestive of a house structure(s)

Artifacts 
A wide variety of artifacts were recovered, including bone and antler artifacts, brass artifacts, pottery, stone tools, glass artifacts, ground and polished stone artifacts, iron artifacts, lead artifacts, shell artifacts and smoking pipes.

Pottery 

Four pottery types were noted at the site:

 Bell site type 1 – represented by 1,079 sherds and one complete restored vessel.  This type consists of grit-tempered, smooth-surfaced spherical vessels with everted rims.  Decoration consists of punctates and incised lines.  Strap handles are present on some vessels.  This pottery type has also been noted at the Arrowsmith site in central Illinois and sites in the area of Saginaw, Michigan.  The cultural affiliation is believed to be the Fox tribe.
 Bell site type 2 – represented by 171 sherds.  This type consists of grit-tempered, spherical vessels with everted rims.  Exterior surfaces are cord marked from the neck down with the neck area well-smoothed.  No decorations were noted other than finger-crimping of the rim.  This type has also been found at the Rock Island site in Door County, Wisconsin.  The cultural affiliation is believed to be the Potawatomi tribe.
 Lake Winnebago focus – 23 sherds were thought by the authors to be affiliated with this Oneota pottery type.  These sherds were shell-tempered with smooth surfaces.  Cultural affiliation is thought to be a Siouan-speaking group, possibly the Winnebago tribe.
 LaSalle filleted – represented by 3 rim sherds.  This type is grit-tempered with cordmarked surface.  Fillets and strap handles were noted on individual sherds.  This pottery type has been noted in the Starved Rock area of Illinois.

Significance 
Archaeologists have found great difficulty in identifying the material culture of the Great Lakes Indian tribes and tracing it back to prehistoric times.  At the time of European contact, tribes were moving around and becoming displaced due to conflicts such as the Iroquois wars, as well as the changing economic patterns brought about by the fur trade.  As a result, it's difficult for archaeologists to place tribes accurately in their prehistoric homeland.  Furthermore, after contact with Europeans, the tribes traded for items such as brass kettles and steel knives which replaced the native pottery and stone tools.  Thus, the material culture vanished and in many cases created a disconnect in the archaeological record between the prehistoric and historic periods.

With the discovery of the Bell site, for the first time Fox material culture could be observed in an intact early historic context.  The Bell site type 1 pottery style can be attributed to the Fox tribe with confidence since it is the predominant pottery type present at the site.  Subsequently, excavations at a known Potawatomi site (Rock Island) yielded Bell site type II pottery, which indicates that pottery type was manufactured by the Potawatomi.  In both cases, this was the first time that specific pottery styles could be attributed with confidence to either tribe.

References

Further reading 

Archaeological sites in Wisconsin
Sac and Fox
Winnebago County, Wisconsin